There are 54 listed buildings (Swedish: byggnadsminne) in Örebro County.

Askersund Municipality

Degerfors Municipality
placeholder

Hallsberg Municipality
placeholder

Hällefors Municipality
placeholder

Karlskoga Municipality
placeholder

Kumla Municipality
placeholder

Laxå Municipality
placeholder

Lekeberg Municipality
placeholder

Lindesberg Municipality
placeholder

Ljusnarsberg Municipality
placeholder

Nora Municipality
placeholder

Örebro Municipality
placeholder

External links

  Bebyggelseregistret

Listed buildings in Sweden